Kabrastan is a 1988 low budget Hindi horror film directed and produced by Mohan Bhakri. This film was released on 10 June 1988.

Plot
William D'Souza wanted to become a doctor and creates a miraculous surgery involving a heart transplant. One day a patient required a heart transplant but needed a fresh heart. He murdered one innocent person and transplanted his heart to his patient. After he succeeded, the dead body wanted to take revenge and started murdering one by one the doctor's family.

Cast
 Hemant Birje as Rocky D'Souza
 Amjad Khan as Napoleon D'Costa
 Javed Khan as Mike
 Kunika as Kitty
 Raza Murad as William D'Souza
 Jagdeep as Hitler
 Huma Khan as Madhumati
 Satish Kaul as Inspector
 Kamna
 Daljeet Kaur
 Ram Mohan as Priest
 Birbal as Butler
 Ved Goswami
 Sunil Dhawan

References

External links
 

1988 films
1980s Hindi-language films
Indian horror films
1988 horror films
Hindi-language horror films